Ellen Beck may refer to:
 Ellen Beck (poet)
 Ellen Beck (soprano)